Maxie is a given name, a nickname and a surname. It may also refer to:

Films
 Maxie (1954 film), an Austrian film
 Maxie (1985 film), a fantasy movie starring Glenn Close
 The Butchers, a 1970 horror film originally release as Maxie

Places
 Maxie, Louisiana, Acadia Parish, Louisiana, United States, an unincorporated community
Maxie, Mississippi, United States, an unincorporated community
 Maxie, Virginia, United States, an unincorporated community
 Maxie Theatre, Trumann, Arkansas, United States, on the National Register of Historic Places

See also
Maxey (disambiguation)